Mal Mathad Moore (December 19, 1939 – March 30, 2013) was an American football coach and college athletics administrator.  He served as the athletic director at the University of Alabama from 1999 to 2013. On November 23, 1999, he was hired as athletic director after spending almost thirty years in other areas with the university. As a player, coach, and director of athletics, Moore was part of ten national championship football teams. In May 2012, he was inducted into the Alabama Sports Hall of Fame. Moore died March 30, 2013 in Durham, North Carolina.

Early years and education
One of seven children, Moore was born December 19, 1939 in Dozier, Alabama, the son of Dempsey Clark Moore (1895–1970) and Fannie Bozeman Moore (1905-2000). As a scholarship player from 1958 to 1962, Moore played as a career backup quarterback for legendary coach Bear Bryant, behind Pat Trammell and subsequently Joe Namath. During his college career at Alabama, Moore earned his bachelor's degree in sociology in 1963 and his master's degree in secondary education in 1964. After he earned his master's degree, at Coach Bryant's suggestion, he joined the Alabama Air National Guard.

Coaching career
During a coaching career that spanned 31 years, Moore spent 22 of those at Alabama, with stops at Montana State, Notre Dame, and the NFL's St. Louis and Phoenix Cardinals. At Alabama, Moore began as Bryant's graduate assistant in 1964, then as defensive backfield coach for six seasons (1965–70) before becoming quarterbacks coach from 1971–82 and serving as the Tide's offensive coordinator starting in 1975.

Moore was instrumental in the installation and implementation of the wishbone offense at Alabama prior to the 1971 season. The move to the wishbone led to an unprecedented decade of success for Bryant and the Crimson Tide. During the wishbone era, Alabama set school records that still stand for yards gained per game (480.7 in 1973), rushing attempts in a season (763 in 1979), rushing yards gained in a season (4,027 in 1973), rushing yards per game for a season (366.1 in 1973), yards per rush for a season (6.06 in 1973), rushing touchdowns (43 in 1973), passing yards per attempt for a season (13.4 in 1973), fewest punts in a season (39 in 1973), rushing first downs in a season (213 in 1979), total offense in a game (833 vs. Virginia Tech in 1973) and rushing yards in a game (748 vs. Virginia Tech in 1973). Moore returned as offensive coordinator under Gene Stallings from 1990-93 before moving into athletic administration.

Athletic director
In 1994, because of his wife's illness, Moore left coaching and moved into the UA Athletic Department as one of the many legacy projects placed in assistant athletic director's positions. An enormously popular figure in the history of University of Alabama athletics, Mal Moore's personal style as Director of Athletics from 1999-2013 generated devotion from the University community at-large, as well as the employees of the department that he oversaw.

After building an impeccable reputation as an assistant football coach at Alabama, Notre Dame and in the National Football League, Moore's enormous success as an athletics administrator was largely personal, as he skillfully and successfully dealt with issues and initiatives that required the cooperation of numerous campus and statewide entities. Moore's superb talent for gaining the respect and affection of those he worked with, as well as those that worked for him, revealed him to be the man perfectly suited to guide Alabama Athletics through a turbulent period into an era of success and prosperity.

Moore possessed a gift for inspiring confidence by harmonizing diverse groups and disparate personalities into a smoothly functioning coalition.  Moore's term as Director of Athletics was a personal triumph. The good-natured sincerity with which he conducted business created an uncomplicated atmosphere that disarmed potential critics and comforted his underlings. Bestowed with the power to lead, he did so through a spirit of conciliation and persuasion. He made complex issues simple and allowed his department to focus on the job at hand.

After an exhaustive search by the UA Board of Trustees, Moore took over as Athletic Director in 1999. Moore was instrumental in the hiring of four head football coaches including Dennis Franchione, Mike Price, Mike Shula, and Nick Saban.  He also oversaw various facility improvements: Bryant–Denny Stadium expanded to its current capacity of over 101,000 seats, renovations were made to Coleman Coliseum in 2005, as well as new tennis, soccer, and softball stadiums.

The University of Alabama's Director of Athletics from 1999 to 2013, Moore was a football player under legendary Crimson Tide head coach Paul W. “Bear” Bryant from 1958–62 and went on to serve as an assistant football coach on Bryant's staff. Moore held the distinction of being a part of ten national championship teams as a player, coach and athletics director (1961, 1964, 1965, 1973, 1978, 1979, 1992, 2009, 2011 and 2012), 16 SEC championships, and 39 bowl trips. He is the only individual connected with the Tide program – and likely the only person in collegiate athletics – to be a part of ten national football championships.

As Director of Athletics, Moore made an indelible mark on one of the nation's most storied athletic programs, leading a department through a period of growth and success both athletically and academically. Moore's vision was to make all Crimson Tide athletic teams and student-athletes nationally competitive at the highest level. His leadership elevated Alabama's athletic facilities to premier status nationally for all sports.

During Moore's tenure as Director of Athletics, Alabama produced national championship teams in football, gymnastics, softball, men's golf and women's golf as well as Southeastern Conference championships in football, basketball, baseball, gymnastics, men's and women's golf, men's cross country and softball. Alabama athletes earned some of the highest honors the SEC and NCAA have to offer, including SEC Athlete of the Year, SEC Scholar-Athlete of the Year and NCAA Sportsperson of the Year. Moore's commitment to excellence has also extended to the classroom as Alabama saw major improvements in scholarship athletic graduation rates and had over 62 Academic All-Americans under Moore's leadership. Under Moore's watch, Alabama has produced 19 NCAA Post Graduate Scholarship winners, 11 NCAA Top VIII selections, three NCAA Woman of the Year finalists, two Campbell Trophy finalists, a Campbell Trophy winner and a Wuerffel award winner. In 2011, the Alabama Football team received the Disney Spirit Award for community service.

Moore directed more than $240 million of capital improvements to University of Alabama athletic facilities.  Those projects encompassed the entire scope of all Crimson Tide athletic programs and benefited every Alabama student-athlete, coach, and administrator. Throughout his administrative career, Moore worked with a diversified field of constituents, from fellow coaches and former players, to fans and the business community. All of those experiences and relationships – in addition to his ability to unify those many constituents – made him uniquely qualified to lead Alabama athletics in the 21st century.

Moore's dedication to and love of the University of Alabama was recognized on March 28, 2007, when, as a permanent tribute to his lifelong contribution to The University of Alabama, the Board of Trustees of The University of Alabama officially dedicated the facility formerly known as The Football Building as the Mal M. Moore Athletic Facility.

In 2011, he was elected to the State of Alabama Sports Hall of Fame for his accomplishments as a coach and an administrator. After the completion of the 2011-12 academic and athletic seasons, Moore was named the winner of the John L. Toner Award, given to the nation's best athletic director. In 2012, the City of Tuscaloosa honored him and his late wife Charlotte by naming the new Caring Days program the Mal and Charlotte Moore Center, a facility that serves as a day program for adults with Alzheimer's and other memory disorders.

Personal life
Moore married Charlotte Moore (née Davis) on July 20, 1968, and had one daughter, Heather, during their marriage. His wife died on January 18, 2010, after battling with Alzheimer's since 1990. On March 30, 2013, Moore died at Duke University Medical Center in Durham, North Carolina, of pulmonary problems at the age of 73.
He was survived by one daughter, Heather Cook of Scottsdale, Arizona, a granddaughter, Anna Lee, and a grandson, Charles Cannon.

References

1939 births
2013 deaths
American football quarterbacks
Alabama Crimson Tide athletic directors
Alabama Crimson Tide football coaches
Alabama Crimson Tide football players
Montana State Bobcats football coaches
Notre Dame Fighting Irish football coaches
St. Louis Cardinals (football) coaches
Phoenix Cardinals coaches
People from Crenshaw County, Alabama
Players of American football from Alabama